Events from the year 1898 in Japan.

Incumbents
Emperor: Emperor Meiji
Prime Minister:
Matsukata Masayoshi: until January 12: 
Itō Hirobumi: January 12 – June 30
Ōkuma Shigenobu: June 30 – November 8
Yamagata Aritomo: starting November 8

Governors
Aichi Prefecture: Egi Kazuyuki then Baron Mori Mamoru
Akita Prefecture: Saburo Iwao
Aomori Prefecture: Ichiro Konoshu
Ehime Prefecture: Park Shin Maki Naomasa then Goro Shinozaki then Oba Kan'ichi
Fukui Prefecture: Shingo Seki
Fukushima Prefecture: Kimumichi Nagusami
Gifu Prefecture: Yoshinori Yumoto then Anraku Kanemichi
Gunma Prefecture: Masataka Ishizata
Hiroshima Prefecture: Asada Tokunori then Baron Takatoshi Iwamura then Hattori Ichizo then Asada Tokunori
Ibaraki Prefecture: Motohiro Onada then Prince Kiyoshi Honba
Ishikawa Prefecture: Shiba Sankarasu
Iwate Prefecture: Ichizo Hattori then Suehiro Naokata
Kagawa Prefecture: Tsunenori Tokuhisa then Ryosuke Ono then Yoshihara Saburo
Kochi Prefecture: Hiroshi Shikakui
Kumamoto Prefecture: Kanetake Oura
Kyoto Prefecture: Utsumi Tadakatsu
Mie Prefecture: Terumi Tanabe then Yuji Rika
Miyagi Prefecture: Viscount Kanetake Oura then Kiyoshi Shin
Miyazaki Prefecture: Senda Sadakatsuki
Nagano Prefecture: Gondo Ka'nichi
Niigata Prefecture: Minoru Katsumata
Oita Prefecture: Shigetoo Sugimoto then Nori Oshikawa
Okinawa Prefecture: Shigeru Narahara
Osaka Prefecture: Nobumichi Yamada
Saga Prefecture: Takeuchi then Yasuhiko Hirayama then Takeuchi then Seki Kiyohide
Saitama Prefecture: Munakata Tadashi then Hanai Hagiwara
Shiname Prefecture: Hikoji Nakamura then Chuzo Kono
Tochigi Prefecture: Sento Kiyoshi then Hagino Samon
Tokyo: Viscount Okabe Nagahon then Koizuka Furo then Baron Sangay Takatomi
Toyama Prefecture: Tsurayuki Ishida then Hiroshi Abe then Kaneoryo Gen
Yamagata Prefecture: Nori Oshikawa then Sone Shizuo

Events
January Unknown date – A construction brand, Kumagai Gumi was founded in Fukui City.
January 12 – Ito Hirobumi begins his third term as Prime Minister.
March 15 – March 1898 Japanese general election
August 10 – September 1898 Japanese general election
The first automobile (a Panhard-Levassor) is introduced in Japan.

Births
February 4 – Shinsui Itō, Nihonga painter (d. 1972)
February 9 – Jūkichi Yagi, poet (d. 1927)
February 15 – Masuji Ibuse, author (d. 1993)
March 17 – Riichi Yokomitsu, writer (d. 1947)
April 28 – Yuzo Saeki, painter (d. 1928)
April 29 – Iwao Yamawaki, photographer (d. 1987)
October 5 – Kenzō Masaoka, anime creator (d. 1988)
October 17 – Shinichi Suzuki, violinist, (d. 1998)
October 31 – Yoshitoshi Mori, artist (d. 1992)
December 11 – Tarō Shōji, popular song singer (d. 1972)
December 12 – Denji Kuroshima, author (d. 1943)
December 27 – Inejiro Asanuma, politician, leader of the Japan Socialist Party (d. 1960)

Deaths
November 12 – Nakahama Manjirō, translator and castaway (b. 1827)

References

 
1890s in Japan